Makkasan railway station is a railway station in Makkasan Subdistrict, Ratchathewi District, Bangkok. It is a class 1 railway station  from Bangkok railway station. The station opened in January 1908 as part of the Eastern Line Bangkok–Chachoengsao Junction section. It is the location of the Makkasan Depot, which opened in 1897 when the railway started operations. Makkasan Depot was destroyed during the Second World War, and was rebuilt using loans from the World Bank.

Despite not having official status as a junction, a freight-only branch line to Mae Nam station, Bangkok Port, and the Bang Chak Oil Refinery branches off from here. A few container and oil trains use the line daily.

Although Makkasan station (Airport Rail Link), shares the same name as Makkasan railway station, it is at a different location; the Airport Rail Link station is nearer to Asok Halt.

Train services 
 Ordinary train No. 275/276 Bangkok – Aranyaprathet – Bangkok
 Ordinary train No. 277/278 Bangkok – Kabin Buri – Bangkok
 Ordinary train No. 279/280 Bangkok – Aranyaprathet – Bangkok
 Ordinary train No. 281/282 Bangkok – Kabin Buri – Bangkok
 Ordinary train No. 283/284 Bangkok – Ban Phlu Ta Luang – Bangkok
 Ordinary train No. 285/286 Bangkok – Chachoengsao Junction – Bangkok
 Ordinary train No. 367/368 Bangkok – Chachoengsao Junction – Bangkok
 Ordinary train No. 371/372 Bangkok – Prachin Buri – Bangkok
 Ordinary train No. 376/378 Rangsit – Hua Takhe – Bangkok
 Ordinary train No. 379/380 Bangkok – Hua Takhe – Bangkok
 Ordinary train No. 381/382 Bangkok – Chachoengsao Junction – Bangkok
 Ordinary train No. 383/384 Bangkok – Chachoengsao Junction – Bangkok
 Ordinary train No. 385/388 Bangkok – Chachoengsao Junction – Bangkok
 Ordinary train No. 389/390 Bangkok – Chachoengsao Junction – Bangkok
 Ordinary train No. 391/394 Bangkok – Chachoengsao Junction – Bangkok

Notes

References

Further reading
 
 

Railway stations in Bangkok
Ratchathewi district